Reinhard Gust (born 10 December 1950 in Rostock) is a German rower, who competed for the SC Dynamo Berlin / Sportvereinigung (SV) Dynamo. He won the medals at the international rowing competitions. He is married to fellow rower Sabine Jahn.

References

External links
 

1950 births
Living people
Rowers from Rostock
East German male rowers
Olympic rowers of East Germany
Rowers at the 1972 Summer Olympics
Olympic medalists in rowing
World Rowing Championships medalists for East Germany
Medalists at the 1972 Summer Olympics
Olympic silver medalists for East Germany
Recipients of the Patriotic Order of Merit in bronze
European Rowing Championships medalists